This is a select list of cases decided by the Supreme Court of Tasmania.

: advisory opinion on the use of intoxication as a defence to criminal matters.
: voluntariness and intent in regards to crimes. Special leave to appeal was refused: .
R v Bryant - 1996, Supreme Court - the sentencing of Martin Bryant

See also
 Lists of case law
 Private timber reserve (Tasmania)

Bibliography
Michael Francis Lillas. Tasmanian Supreme Court Judgements: A Digest of Cases 1897-1988. Consolidated Edition. Burnie. Tasmania. 1989. .
For similar publications, see the Australian National Bibliography.

Supreme Court
Tasmanian
Australian case law